The Balang formation, is a Cambrian Period geological formation, which outcrops in western Hunan and eastern Guizhou in southern China. It contains Burgess Shale-type soft-bodied fossils. It is intermediate in age between the Chengjiang and Kaili lagerstatten. It contains a low diversity of trilobites.

References

Geologic formations of China
Cambrian System of Asia
Cambrian China
Cambrian northern paleotemperate deposits
Paleontology in China
Geography of Hunan